Camp Julia Crowell was a Girl Scout camp in Richfield Township, Summit County, Ohio, opened in 1937. It was named for Julia Cobb Crowell, a Cleveland civic leader who served as the city's first Girl Scout commissioner in the 1920s. The camp closed as a Girl Scout property in 2011. 

Since 2014, the camp has been known as the Richfield Heritage Preserve, a public park administered by the Richfield Joint Recreation District.  Camp Crowell Hilaka Historic District was added to the National Register of Historic Places in 2020.

History 
Camp Julia Crowell was opened by the Cleveland Girl Scout Council in 1937, to offer day- and overnight-camping programs, hiking, and water recreation for scouts, as well as national and regional training programs for scout leaders. It was built from 243 acres of land, lakes, and buildings, purchased from private farms, and named for Julia Cobb Crowell (1877–1957), a Cleveland civic leader and Girl Scout commissioner in the 1920s. 

The camp expanded to 336 acres in by 1957, with the addition of the Hilaka (High-Lake) section. In 1967, the physical facilities underwent a major upgrade, with new commons buildings, water and sanitation systems. A new boathouse followed in 1969. In 1998, Camp Quality Northeast Ohio was held at Camp Crowell-Hilaka, serving children with cancer and their siblings.

Camper incidents 
On August 4, 1959, two thirteen-year-old campers were killed by lightning, and two other girls were hospitalized, during a storm at Camp Julia Crowell. In 1999, the parents of a child injured while riding a horse at the camp sued; all the camp's horses were sold in 2005.

Closure and current status 
The camp was sold by the Girl Scouts of North East Ohio in 2011, along with several other properties, despite an organized effort by Friends of Crowell Hilaka, to maintain the program and the site. The Western Reserve Land Conservancy purchased the property in 2015. Since 2014, the site has been known as the Richfield Heritage Preserve, a public park administered by the Richfield Joint Recreation District. In 2020, the Crowell Hilaka Historic District was added to the National Register of Historic Places.

Current park facilities include a segment of the Buckeye Trail, an event center, and accessible camping sites.

References

External links 

 "Waterfront at Camp Julia Crowell", a photograph in the Cleveland Press Collection at the Michael Schwartz Library at Cleveland State University, via Cleveland Memory Project
 "Girl Scouting at Camp Julia Crowell", a 1953 film by the Cleveland Girl Scout Council, part of the IUL Moving Image Archive, Indiana University
 Save Our Beloved Camp Crowell Hilaka, a blog from the effort in 2009 to restore the camp site and programs

Local council camps of the Girls Scouts of the USA
Girl Scouts of the USA
Parks in Ohio